Peter Garling, RFD (born in 1952 in Kuala Lumpur, British Malaya) is an Australian judge, a Judge of the Supreme Court of New South Wales, the highest court in the state of New South Wales.

Garling is noted for his involvement in multiple high-profile public inquiries and royal commissions. Through his contributions, in particular the Garling Report, Garling has made significant recommendations to improve the public health system of New South Wales.

Early life and education
Peter Garling was born to Max and Patricia Garling in British Malaya. He is a descendant of Frederick Garling, one of the first solicitors admitted to the Supreme Court of New South Wales and the first appointed Crown Prosecutor in New South Wales.

Garling was educated at Saint Ignatius' College, Riverview and the University of Sydney, where he earned a Bachelor of Arts (1975) and Bachelor of Laws (1977).

During his university days, Garling joined the Sydney University Regiment of the Australian Army Reserve.

Career

Early legal career
After graduating from the law school, Garling worked as an articled clerk and solicitor at David Landa, Stewart & Company.

Barristerial career
Garling was admitted to the Bar in 1979 and read with Calvin "Cal" R. Callaway QC.  He commenced practising as a barrister in Garfield Barwick Chambers, followed by Second Floor Wentworth Chambers. He practised from Fifth Floor St James Hall from 1992 until his appointment. 

On 4 November 1994, Garling took silk.

Judicial career
In 2010, Garling was appointed as a judge of the Supreme Court of New South Wales.

Other activity
From 1970 to 1996, Garling was a serving member of the Australian Army Reserve. During this time, he served as the second-in-command of 1 Commando Company, and reached the rank of company commander of the Sydney University Regiment. For his extended services to the Army Reserve, he has been awarded the Reserve Force Decoration.

Garling has been involved in multiple public inquiries and royal commissions, including those into the 1997 Thredbo landslide, the Glenbrook and Waterfall railway accidents, the collapse of the HIH Insurance, and the affairs of the Medical Research and Compensation Foundation. He served as the Commissioner conducting the Special Commission of Inquiry into Acute Care Services in NSW Public Hospitals, authoring the Garling Report.

Personal life
Garling's three brothers also completed law degrees. At the time of his appointment, brother Max had become a mining entrepreneur; Anthony was a NSW District Court judge; and Kim, a private practice lawyer and former President of the Law Society of New South Wales.

In 1980, Garling married Jane Anne Loneragan, who is a solicitor and was a lecturer at the University of Technology, Sydney. Garling's elder daughter, Antonia, is a lawyer at [Gilbert + Tobin), while his other daughter Lucinda (Lucie) is a chartered accountant at Westpac.

See also
The Garling Report

References

External links
Special Commission of Inquiry: Acute Care Services in NSW Public Hospitals - Lawlink, Department of Attorney General and Justice

1952 births
Australian Army personnel
Australian barristers
Lawyers from Sydney
Living people
People educated at Saint Ignatius' College, Riverview
People from Kuala Lumpur
Judges of the Supreme Court of New South Wales
Sydney Law School alumni
Academic staff of the University of Sydney
21st-century Australian judges